A Simple Case is a 1932 Soviet film directed by Vsevolod Pudovkin and Mikhail Doller. Pudovkin was publicly charged with formalism for this experimental sound film and was forced to release without its sound track.

Cast
 Aleksandr Baturin - Langovoy
 Yevgeniya Rogulina - Mashenka
 Aleksandr Chistyakov - Uncle Sasha
 V. Kuzmich - Zheltikov
 Mariya Belousova
 Anatoli Gorchilin - worker
 A. Chekulayeva
 Ivan Novoseltsev - Vasya
 Afanasi Belov - Grisha
 Vladimir Uralsky - Wounded soldier

References

External links

1932 films
Gorky Film Studio films
Soviet black-and-white films
Films directed by Vsevolod Pudovkin
Films directed by Mikhail Doller
Soviet romance films
1930s romance films
1930s Russian-language films